New York's 90th State Assembly district is one of the 150 districts in the New York State Assembly. It has been represented by Democratic Assemblyman Nader Sayegh since 2019.

Geography 
District 90 is located entirely within Westchester County. It consists of a majority of Yonkers.

Recent election results

2022

2020

2018

2016

2014

2012

References 

90
Westchester County, New York